The Colombian gracile mouse opossum (Gracilinanus perijae) is a species of opossum in the family Didelphidae.
It is endemic to Colombia.

Its natural habitat is subtropical or tropical moist lowland forests.

Sources
 New World Marsupial Specialist Group 1996.  Gracilinanus perijae.   2006 IUCN Red List of Threatened Species.   Downloaded on 29 July 2007.

Opossums
Endemic fauna of Colombia
Mammals of Colombia
Marsupials of South America
Taxonomy articles created by Polbot